Ere. Elamvazhuthi (born 5 September 1925) was a Member of Legislative Assembly (MLA) from the Cuddalore constituency of Tamil Nadu from 1967 to 1970 representing Dravida Munnetra Kazhagam (DMK).  He was born in Sangolikuppam, a village near Cuddalore to Rengasamy and Soundharam.   He was closer to Periyar EV Ramasamy and CN Annadurai and got himself renamed as Elamvazhuthi from his original Dhandapani due to his unrelenting belief and support for the Dravidian principles.  He was a staunch rationalist though his father used to do priestly duties at Sangolikuppam.

He had his schooling in St.Joseph's College (though a school, it used to be called a college), Cuddalore, under and post graduation in Annamalai University and Law in Law College, Chennai.  He was married to Visalatchi and later to Annapoorani as his first wife met with an accident and died in Kurinjipadi.  He was a reputed lawyer and a great orator, both in Tamil and English. He was so fond of Tamil that he named his children Mekala, E. Pugazhendi, Udhayarani, Kalaiarasi, Malathi and Pannir Selvam.

He was felicitated by CN Annadurai when he became a lawyer, by publishing his photo on the first page of Dravida Nadu, a journal run by CN Annadurai himself and later fondly called him "Black Prince".  He was involved fully into the anti Hindi agitations called by the Dravidian leaders and went to the prison thrice.  As an MLA or otherwise Cuddalore was closer to his heart and toiled to bring it up by helping in the infrastructure development and helped people from all walks of life.  He met with an untimely death on 22 October 1970 due to heart attack.  When this news was informed, the Chief Minister M Karunanidhi, a close friend of Elamvazhuthi, cancelled all his programmes on his way to Trichy and returned from Virudhachalam to Cuddalore.

His wife, who he renamed fondly Selvi, lives in Cuddalore in the house built by him.

References

Dravida Munnetra Kazhagam politicians
Annamalai University alumni
1925 births
1970 deaths